Giuseppe Sinigaglia  (28 January 1884 – 10 August 1916) was an Italian rower. He won the Diamond Challenge Sculls at Henley Royal Regatta and eight medals at the European championships of 1906–1913 in various rowing events. He died of wounds during World War I.

Biography
Sinigaglia was born at Como the son of Antonio Sinigaglia and his wife Antoinette. His parents ran a restaurant, but his father emigrated to South America and never returned. He was educated at Gaius Plinius Technical Institute and was a member of Pool Comense 1872 until 1903 when he was expelled for indiscipline. He  then joined Canottieri Lario. In 1907 he won the Italian championship in a coxed pair. In 1911 he was Italian and European Champion in the single scull and in the double scull with Teodoro Mariani.  In 1914, Sinigaglia won the Diamond Challenge Sculls at Henley beating Colin Stuart in the final.

  
After the outbreak of World War I, Sinigaglia volunteered into the Royal Italian Army and was assigned to  the 2nd Regiment Granatieri di Sardegna Mechanized Brigade. After a period of training he took part in the offensive against Monte Sabotino and Monte Podgora. In 1916 he was promoted to lieutenant and fought in the Battle of Asiago. He later took part in the Sixth Battle of the Isonzo at Monte San Michele and Gorizia. On 9 August 1916, Sinigaglia led his men in an attack on Hill 4 of Monte San Michele. He was hit by Austrian fire and was transported the hospital at San Vito al Torre where he died the next day.

Sinigaglia was awarded the Silver Medal of Military Valor. The stadium Stadio Giuseppe Sinigaglia was named in his honour.

References

Bibliography

Maurizio Casarola, Lo chiamavano Sina, Nordpress Edizioni, 2007.
Mario Bazzi, Il gigante buono, Tipografia Commerciale Prini & C., Como.

1884 births
1916 deaths
Italian male rowers
Recipients of the Silver Medal of Military Valor
Italian military personnel killed in World War I
Sportspeople from Como
European Rowing Championships medalists